Zombie Holocaust is a 1980 Italian horror film directed by Marino Girolami. The film is about a team of scientists who follow a trail of corpses in New York to a remote Indonesian island where they meet a mad doctor (Donald O'Brien) who performs experiments on  both the living and dead in his laboratory. The team face both zombies and cannibals in an attempt to stop the doctor. The film was re-edited and released theatrically in the United States in 1982 under the title Doctor Butcher M.D.

Plot
In New York City, a hospital worker is found to have been devouring bodies in the morgue. Morgue assistant and anthropology expert Lori (Alexandra Delli Colli) discovers he was from the Asian Molucca islands where she grew up. Dr. Peter Chandler (Ian McCulloch) investigates, and he and Lori discover that similar corpse mutilations have occurred in other city hospitals, where immigrants from this region are working.

Peter leads an expedition to the islands to investigate, where he liaises with Doctor Obrero (Donald O'Brien). Included are his assistant George, George's eager journalist girlfriend Susan, Lori, local boatsman Molotto assigned by Obrero, and three guides. The crew is hunted by cannibals and zombies, the latter created by the sinister Doctor Obrero, who is experimenting with corpses.

Lori is accepted as queen of the cannibals and sends them off against the mad scientist and his zombie army.

Cast
 Ian McCulloch as Dr. Peter Chandler
 Alexandra Delli Colli as Lori Ridgeway
 Sherry Buchanan as Susan Kelly
 Peter O'Neal as George Harper
 Donald O'Brien as Dr. Obrero/Dr. Butcher (US version)
 Dakar as Molotto
 Walter Patriarca as Dr. Dreylock

Release
The film was released in Italy in 1980 and grossed a total of 300 million Italian lira. It was released in the United States in 1982 in a heavily edited form under the title Doctor Butcher M.D., which incorporated footage from an unreleased film shot by director Roy Frumkes. In addition to the title Zombie Holocaust, the film has since been released under various other English titles, including Island of the Last Zombies, Queen of the Cannibals and Zombie 3.

Home media

The film was first released on DVD on May 21, 2002 by Shriek Show and was available both separately and in a triple feature package. The Zombie Pack Vol. 2 contains Zombie Holocaust, Burial Ground: The Nights of Terror and Flesheater. Shriek Show released the film on Blu-ray for the first time in the U.S. on June 28, 2011, with 88 Films giving the film its UK Blu-ray debut in 2015.

In 2016, Severin Films issued a deluxe edition two-disc Blu-ray that included both Zombie Holocaust and Doctor Butcher M.D., as well as a multitude of bonus features. The first 5,000 copies of this edition also included a replica of the "barf bag" given out at some original screenings of Doctor Butcher M.D.

Reception

In The Zombie Movie Encyclopedia, academic Peter Dendle stated that "Some of the gore effects are quite good, but other than that the movie is a stock accumulation of familiar motifs."  Bloody Disgusting rated it 5/5 stars and recommended it to fans of Italian gore films. Author Glenn Kay of Zombie Movies: The Ultimate Guide referred to it as "a bad movie; for Italian zombie gore fans only." Danny Shipka, author of a book on European exploitation films, noted that Zombie Holocaust showed how quickly the zombie subgenre "degenerated into stupidity" and that the film "fuses the cannibal genre and the zombie film into an incoherent mess".

See also
 List of zombie movies

Footnotes

References

External links
 
 Zombie Holocaust at Variety Distribution

1980 horror films
1980 films
Italian zombie films
Cannibal-boom films
Films set in New York City
1980s Italian-language films
English-language Italian films
1980s English-language films
Films directed by Marino Girolami
Films set in Indonesia
Films scored by Nico Fidenco
1980 multilingual films
Italian multilingual films
1980s Italian films